Man and Boy is a 1999 novel by Tony Parsons. It was awarded the 2001 British Book of the Year award.

Plot introduction
Harry Silver is a successful television producer about to turn 30. He is happily married, has a four-year-old son and drives a convertible sports car. Then he spends the night with a colleague from work and his life falls apart; his wife leaves him and emigrates to Japan, he loses his job and he has to cope with being a single parent. He also has to deal with the trauma of his father dying from cancer. While coping with these stresses in his life, he meets another woman at a coffee shop, a woman whom he has already met with her child, then they part. Harry finds a new job and eventually moves on with his life.

TV Adaptation

A BBC One adaptation of the book was aired in 2002 starring Ioan Gruffudd and Elizabeth Mitchell.

Sequels
In 2003 a sequel was released, Man and Wife, followed in 2010 by Men From the Boys to complete the trilogy.

References

1999 British novels
British romance novels
British novels adapted into films
British novels adapted into television shows
HarperCollins books